The Beyonders are a fictional enigmatic higher-dimensional race appearing in American comic books published by Marvel Comics. They live outside the multiverse and are the beings responsible for the multiverse's destruction during Jonathan Hickman's Avengers, New Avengers, and Secret Wars saga.

Publication history
The Beyonders were first mentioned in the team-up comic Marvel Two-in-One #63 (May 1980), by Mark Gruenwald and Jerry Bingham.

The Beyonders received an entry in the Official Handbook of the Marvel Universe Update '89 #1. They also received an entry in Secret Wars Official Guide to the Marvel Multiverse.

An initially unrelated character called the Beyonder was tied to these older characters by Steve Englehart for his "Secret Wars III" story in Fantastic Four #318–319 (September–October 1988). The Beyonder first appeared during the first Secret Wars, as a being that was stated to be the omnipotent embodiment of an entire separated multiverse. As he became self-aware, he recognized himself as the only person in his Universe. According to Englehart, an editor hated the character and ordered the Beyonder "removed" from the Marvel Universe. Englehart did as asked but has stated that he tried to exile the character with dignity. The character was retconned into a less powerful character, a self-aware Cosmic Cube inhabiting his own "dimension" because there was no matrix to hold his energy, with the explanation that other more powerful beings had exercised their powers on the Beyonder's behalf to ease his transition into self-awareness. The Beyonder later underwent another retcon, briefly becoming a mutant inhuman, and after a last retcon is now considered to be a member of the alien race of the same name and is referred to as a "child unit" by the Beyonders.

The Beyonders were greatly expanded upon in Al Ewing's Defenders: Beyond series. They were revealed to be the same race as the "Omegas" previously seen in Defenders (2011–2012) and briefly appeared in Ultimates 2 (2016) #6. Their origin story was revealed and were tied to the Celestials; the "Beyond" space that they dwell was revealed to be formerly the Second Cosmos, the first multiverse that formed after the Celestial War.

Fictional history
The Beyonders are a race of extra-dimensional entities that were created by the Celestials following the creation of the Second Cosmos, the first multiverse, in the Celestial War. They were originally called "Omegas" by the Celestials. When the Second Cosmos ended and was reborn as the next iteration of the multiverse, the Omegas observed from the outside and thus became known as the Beyonders.

For millennia they were not observed by any being of the Earth dimension (apparently including even the near-omniscient Watchers themselves); their 'true form' is unknown because each mind that views them, struggles as best as it can to perceive that unknowable force as an image it can comprehend, in fact,  their nature is so alien that they are constrained and restricted to their own sequential timeline which prevented them from leaving their dimension or travel through time. In order to interact outside their dimension the Beyonders are forced to operate through agents. After becoming aware of the Earth, the Beyonders began studying the Marvel Multiverse with amusement and curiosity. They first came to the attention of Earthlings when they commissioned the alien Nuwali race to create the Savage Land as part of their study of evolution. Thousands of years later, the Beyonders created the Fortisquians as agents to observe other worlds, including Max.

They eventually hired the Pegasusian alien race as agents, to tow Counter-Earth to the Beyonders' museum. When the High Evolutionary discovered the disappearance of Counter-Earth, alongside the Thing, Alicia Masters, Starhawk, Moondragon, and Her, the Evolutionary pursued the Beyonders to rescue his world. When the Evolutionary arrived at the Beyonders' planet museum, he himself reported that his mind snapped when he witnessed the scope of their powers and how effectively insignificant he was compared to these alien beings. It is this encounter that marks the beginning of the High Evolutionary's mental instability.

Every now and then the Beyonders would shunt a modicum of energy to the universe, allowing sentient beings to use them to create Cosmic Cubes—a practice they appear to have given up after the admonishments by Eternity and the Living Tribunal regarding the disruptive effect of these actions. One of these energy modicums would later develop sentience and take its name after its creators, the Beyonder.

Time Runs Out
When entire universes throughout the Multiverse began to collide with each other, with each universe's respective Earth being the points of impact—events known as "incursions"—the Avengers send Hank Pym to find answers at the start of the "Time Runs Out" storyline. Instead, he learns the incursions are being caused by the Beyonders, whom he also refers to as the Ivory Kings. Upon returning to Earth, he tells his fellow heroes that the Beyonders have killed the Living Tribunal along with all the Celestials, and every abstract entity (including Eternity, Infinity, Lord Chaos, Master Order, and the In-Betweener) as part of an experiment involving the destruction of all life throughout the Marvel Multiverse.

As all of reality was being destroyed, the trickster Loki uses magic to both exit reality and safely contain the essence of his fellow Asgardians. Finding himself in a blank void of nothingness, Loki is confronted by Those Who Sit Above in Shadows, allegedly the creators of the Asgardians, who demanded to be given the Asgardians' essence to feed on it. Loki defied Those Who Sit Above in Shadows, and even put into question their origin and existence, by asking if the gods such as the Asgardians actually came from the stories that have been told about them, so it was possible that the gods of the gods did not create them in the first place. Unable to answer or even counter the questions posed by Loki, Those Who Sit Above in Shadows fled. Loki hypothesized that Those Who Sit Above In Shadow could very well be the Beyonders.

Later, Rabum Alal reveals to Doctor Strange that the Beyonders are responsible for the accident that turned Owen Reece into the Molecule Man, by using the child unit "The Beyonder" which in turn made the Molecule Man to be a singularity—identical in every reality—to function as a "bomb" that would destroy its native universe. The purpose of their experiment was to eventually kill all of the Molecule Men at the same time, bringing an end to the multiverse. After discovering the Beyonders are unable to travel through time since they are constrained and restricted to their own sequential timeline, Doom, Strange and Molecule Man confront the Beyonders one last time. Their attack apparently failed and as a result the number of universes was reduced from thousands to barely more than two dozen.

Secret Wars
It was soon revealed that Doom's attack was a bomb made of Molecule Men he collected from throughout the Multiverse, which not only allowed him to destroy the Beyonders but at the same time channel the resulting energy into Owen Reece, and use that energy to collect what remained of the Multiverse into a single planet known as Battleworld.

A number of survivors of the Multiverse were also collected and brought to Battleworld, now under the reign of the now-cosmically powered "God Emperor" Doom - their memories altered to become the lords and ladies of various factions of a medieval new order. The arrival of a handful of other survivors who recalled the truth shattered this illusion. Owen Reece, the conduit for the Beyonders' power, transferred that power to Reed Richards, leading to the Multiverse's recreation.

Defenders
The Defenders encountered the Beyonders when they went outside the Multiverse. The Beyonders explained their origin and history before the Defenders went further beyond into the White Hot Room.

Powers and abilities
The Beyonders have been witnessed killing all of the Celestials in the Marvel multiverse at the same time, destroying abstract entities such as Eternity and Infinity, and three members of the race together managed to kill the Living Tribunal itself.

The Beyonders are what Doctor Doom calls "linear beings". Despite their vast powers and knowledge, they seem unable to travel forward or backward in time. They have also displayed other limitations, as an explosion strong enough to destroy a few thousand universes was sufficient to kill them.

References

External links
 Beyonders at Marvel Wiki

Characters created by Mark Gruenwald
Fictional higher-dimensional characters
Marvel Comics alien species